The Pakistan national korfball team is managed by the Pakistan Korfball Federation (PKF), representing Pakistan in korfball international competitions.

Their international debut in a competition was in the 2008 Asia Championship.

Tournament history

Current squad
National team in the 2010 Asia-Oceania Championship

 Coach: Hammad Asghar Awan

References 

National korfball teams
Korfball
National team